Senator Wheat may refer to:

Lloyd F. Wheat (1923–2004), Louisiana State Senate
Mike Wheat (born 1947), Montana State Senate